Cochlostoma euboicum is a species of small land snail with an operculum, a terrestrial gastropod mollusc in the family Cochlostomatidae.

Geographic distribution 
C. euboicum is endemic to Greece, where it occurs on the island of Evia.

References

Diplommatinidae
Molluscs of Europe
Endemic fauna of Greece
Gastropods described in 1885